The Chicago White Sox are a Major League Baseball franchise based in Chicago. They play in the American League Central division. The White Sox have used 62 Opening Day starting pitchers since they were established as a Major League team in 1901. The first game of the new baseball season for a team is played on Opening Day, and being named the Opening Day starter is an honor, which is often given to the player who is expected to lead the pitching staff that season, though there are various strategic reasons why a team's best pitcher might not start on Opening Day. The White Sox have a record of 60 wins and 53 losses in their Opening Day games, through the 2013 season.

The White Sox have played in three different home ball parks. They played at South Side Park from 1901 through the middle of 1910, the first Comiskey Park from 1910 through 1990, and have played at the second Comiskey Park, now known as U.S. Cellular Field, since 1991. They had a record of four wins and two losses in Opening Day games at South Side Park, 18 wins and 19 losses at the first Comiskey Park and four wins and one loss at U.S. Cellular Field, for a total home record in Opening Day games of 27 wins and 22 losses. Their record in Opening Day away games is 33 wins and 31 losses.

Mark Buehrle holds the record for making the most Opening Day starts for the White Sox, with nine. Billy Pierce had seven Opening Day starts for the White Sox, Wilbur Wood had five, Tommy Thomas and Jack McDowell each had four, and Frank Smith, Jim Scott, Lefty Williams, Sad Sam Jones, Bill Dietrich, Gary Peters and Tommy John each had three. Several Baseball Hall of Famers have made Opening Day starts for the White Sox, including Ed Walsh, Red Faber, Ted Lyons, Early Wynn and Tom Seaver.

The White Sox have played in the World Series five times. They won in 1906, 1917 and 2005, and lost in 1919 and 1959.  Frank Owen was the Opening Day starting pitcher in 1906, Williams in 1917 and 1919, Pierce in 1959 and Buehrle in 2005.  The White Sox won all five Opening Day games in those seasons.

In addition to being the White Sox' Opening Day starter in 1917 and 1919, Williams was also the Opening Day starter in 1920.  However, he was suspended from the team later in the season and then banned from baseball for life for his role in throwing the 1919 World Series. Ed Cicotte, who had been the White Sox' 1918 Opening Day starter, was also banned from baseball as a result of his actions during the 1919 World Series. Ken Brett's Opening Day start on April 7, 1977, against the Toronto Blue Jays was the first game in Blue Jays' history. The Blue Jays won the game 9–5.

Key

Pitchers

References
General

Specific

Opening day starters
Lists of Major League Baseball Opening Day starting pitchers